Bally's Corporation is a gaming, betting, and interactive entertainment company headquartered in Providence, Rhode Island. It owns and operates 15 casinos across ten states, a horse track in Colorado, and online sports betting operations in 14 states. Additionally, the company owns the sports betting platform Bet.Works, daily fantasy sports operator Monkey Knife Fight, and SportCaller, a free-to-play game provider.

The company was founded in 2004 as BLB Investors. It eventually changed its name to Twin River Worldwide Holdings. In 2020, the company acquired the rights to the Bally's brand from Caesars Entertainment and changed its own name to Bally's Corporation.

History
Bally's originated as BLB Investors. BLB was formed in 2004 as a joint venture between Starwood Capital Group, Kerzner International, and the Waterford Group for the purpose of launching a bid to acquire Wembley plc. Wembley was a British operator of racetracks in the United Kingdom and the United States, whose primary asset was Lincoln Park, a greyhound track and slot machine parlor in Rhode Island. BLB reached a deal in February 2005, agreeing to pay $435 million for Lincoln Park, plus $20 million for Wembley's other U.S. properties, comprising a horse track (Arapahoe Park) and three greyhound tracks in Colorado. The purchase closed in July 2005.

BLB undertook a $220-million expansion of Lincoln Park and, in 2007, renamed it Twin River.

By 2008, as a result of the global economic recession, BLB was struggling financially and began defaulting on loans related to the purchase and renovation of Twin River. In June 2009, the company filed for Chapter 11 bankruptcy protection with a prepackaged plan to hand over ownership to its creditors. The company emerged from bankruptcy in 2010, now owned by a syndicate of lenders led by Bank of America, Wells Fargo, and Sankaty Advisors. In 2011, the company changed its name to Twin River Worldwide Holdings.

In Colorado, the company's three dog racing tracks closed as interest in the sport declined, and all three were sold off by 2011.

Land-based gaming expansion
In 2014, Twin River bought the Hard Rock Hotel & Casino Biloxi in Mississippi from Leucadia National for $250 million.  The acquisition was made to diversify the company geographically, in preparation for expected competition from Massachusetts, which had legalized casinos in 2011.

In 2015, Twin River purchased Rhode Island's only other casino, the Newport Grand, for $22 million, and announced plans to relocate its operations to a new facility to be built in Tiverton, Rhode Island. The Newport Grand closed in 2018, and its replacement, the $140-million Tiverton Casino Hotel, opened days later.

In 2016, hedge fund Standard General took an ownership stake in Twin River, and its principal partner, Soo Kim, took a seat on the board. Kim went on to become Twin River's chairman in 2019, and began leading the company through a rapid expansion.

In March 2019, Twin River completed a reverse merger with Dover Downs Gaming & Entertainment, the parent company of Dover Downs Hotel & Casino. The transaction made Twin River a public company traded on the New York Stock Exchange and left Dover Downs shareholders with a 7 percent stake in the combined company.

In January 2020, Twin River purchased three casinos in Black Hawk, Colorado (the Golden Gates, Golden Gulch, and Mardi Gras) from Affinity Gaming for $51 million.

In July 2020, Twin River bought two casinos in Missouri and Mississippi (Isle of Capri Casino Kansas City and Lady Luck Casino Vicksburg) from Eldorado Resorts for $230 million. They were renamed Casino KC and Casino Vicksburg.

Later that month, Twin River acquired the rights to the Bally's brand from Caesars Entertainment for $20 million. At the time, Twin River said that it would rebrand "virtually all" of its properties under the Bally's name. In November 2020, the company changed its name to Bally's Corporation and its stock ticker symbol to BALY. Days later, the company closed on purchasing Bally's Atlantic City from Caesars and Vici Properties for $25 million.

Bally's acquired the Eldorado Shreveport casino hotel in Louisiana from Eldorado Resorts in December 2020 for $140 million.

In January 2021, Bally's partnered with developer Ira Lubert in a plan to build a $120-million casino in the area of State College, Pennsylvania. The next month, the company announced another proposed casino development, Bally's Richmond, which would be built in Richmond, Virginia, at a cost of $650 million; the proposal was rejected by the city.

In April 2021, Bally's acquired the operations of the MontBleu casino in Nevada from Caesars for $15 million, and later renamed it Bally’s Lake Tahoe. Bally's also entered a sale-and-leaseback deal with Gaming and Leisure Properties, Inc. (GLPI) for the three Black Hawk casinos and Jumer's, agreeing to sell them for $150 million and lease them back for $12 million per year.

In June 2021, Bally's bought Jumer's Casino & Hotel in Illinois from Delaware North for $120 million, and also purchased the operating business of Tropicana Evansville in Indiana from Caesars for $140 million. To fund the Tropicana purchase, the real estate of Dover Downs was sold to GLPI for $144 million in a leaseback transaction.

In January 2022, Standard General moved to take full ownership of Bally's, offering to buy all outstanding shares in a transaction valuing the company at $2.07 billion. The board of directors rejected the offer in May.

In May 2022, Chicago mayor Lori Lightfoot selected Bally's proposal to build the $1.7-billion Bally's Chicago casino resort in the city's River West neighborhood. A temporary site is planned to open in mid-2023 at the Medinah Temple, before phase 1 of the new, permanent facility is completed by 2026.  It was projected to eventually account for one third of the company's gaming revenue.

In September 2022, Bally's purchased the non-land assets of the Tropicana Las Vegas from GLPI and Penn Entertainment for $148 million.

Interactive gaming expansion
In November 2020, Bally's entered into a long-term media partnership with Sinclair Broadcast Group, which would include the rebranding of its Fox Sports Networks regional sports networks under the Bally brand in a 10-year deal, and integration of Bally's content into its sports properties. The agreement included warrants that would allow Sinclair to acquire up to a 14.9% stake in Bally's, and increase its stake to up to 24.9% if performance criteria are met. The nineteen regional sports networks were rebranded as Bally Sports in March 2021.

In 2021, Bally's made several acquisitions to expand its online gaming and sports betting business. In February, it acquired SportCaller, a provider of free-to-play online games. The next month, the company acquired Monkey Knife Fight, the third-largest daily fantasy sports operator in the U.S., for up to $90 million in stock. In June, Bally's acquired the sports betting platform Bet.Works for $125 million. In July, it acquired the Association of Volleyball Professionals. In October, it acquired Gamesys Group, a British online gambling company, for $2.7 billion,

Properties
The company operates fourteen casino properties and a standalone horse track:
 Bally's Arapahoe Park — Aurora, Colorado
 Bally's Atlantic City — Atlantic City, New Jersey
 Bally's Black Hawk — Black Hawk, Colorado
 Bally's Chicago - Chicago, Illinois (under development, planned to open in 2026)
 Bally's Dover — Dover, Delaware
 Bally's Evansville — Evansville, Indiana
 Bally's Kansas City — Kansas City, Missouri
 Bally's Lake Tahoe — Stateline, Nevada
 Bally's Quad Cities — Rock Island, Illinois
 Bally's Shreveport — Shreveport, Louisiana
 Bally's Tiverton — Tiverton, Rhode Island
 Bally's Twin River Lincoln — Lincoln, Rhode Island
 Bally's Vicksburg — Vicksburg, Mississippi
 Hard Rock Hotel & Casino Biloxi — Biloxi, Mississippi
 Tropicana Las Vegas — Paradise, Nevada

References

External links

2004 establishments in the United States
American companies established in 2004
Gambling companies of the United States
Companies based in Providence County, Rhode Island
Companies listed on the New York Stock Exchange
Entertainment companies of the United States
Entertainment companies established in 2004